The Wrong Girl is an Australian drama television series, based on Zoë Foster Blake's book of the same name, that first aired on Network Ten on 28 September 2016.

The series follows Lily Woodward, a producer on a morning television show, and what happens when life, love and friendships collide. Longing for a life rich in romance, a dynamic career and a happy family, Lily is constantly thrown off course. As her journey continues, Lily discovers that sometimes the right choices can lead to the wrong places and the wrong choices can turn out to be the right ones. 

On 4 November 2016, Network 10 renewed the series for second season to be aired in 2017, with filming beginning on 29 May 2017. The second season premiered on 24 August 2017. In November 2017, ‘’The Wrong Girl’’ was snubbed from Network Ten's announced 2018 upfronts with no word on whether the show has been cancelled or put on hiatus.

Cast

Main
 Jessica Marais as Lily Woodward
 Ian Meadows as Pete Barnett
 Rob Collins as Jack Winters
 Hayley Magnus as Simone
 Kerry Armstrong as Mimi Woodward
 Craig McLachlan as Eric Albrectson
 Hugo Johnstone-Burt as Vincent Woodward
 Madeleine West as Erica Jones
 Christie Whelan-Browne as Nikki
 Cecilia Peters as Alice

Recurring
 David Woods as Dale
 Doris Younane as Sasha
 Leah Vandenberg as Meredith
 Steve Vizard as Anthony Woodward
 Kevin Harrington as Ivan
 Ryan Shelton as Bernard
 Hamish Blake as Hamilton (season 1)
 Natalie Bassingthwaighte as Gillian (season 2)

Series overview

Episodes

Season 1 (2016)

Season 2 (2017)

Production
An adaptation of Zoe Foster Blake's best-selling book of the same name, The Wrong Girl is a Playmaker Media production, and is produced by Tom Hoffie and Judi McCrossin. On 19 November 2015, Network Ten announced The Wrong Girl as part of their programming line-up for 2016. Filming commenced on 18 April 2016,  in Yarraville, an inner-west suburb of Melbourne, Victoria. Production for season two returned to Yarraville in June 2017.

Reception

Critical response
Comparing Marais' character to that of Bridget Jones, Holly Byrne of News Corp Australia Network went on to write, "The Wrong Girl is the right show, at just the right time for a new generation who should celebrate the joys of being single and embrace the chaos every working woman will recognise in Jessica Marais’ lead character, Lily Woodward", while Matilda Dixon-Smith of The Guardian wrote, "The Wrong Girl is light, funny and broadly appealing, well-targeted toward a swath of young female viewers who were likely getting their romcom jollies from streaming services like Netflix and Stan". 
The Sydney Morning Herald further praised the premiering, describing it as, "Channel Ten's next big thing", however, Daily Review were less than favourable in their review, pointing out that the show, "rated pretty poorly for a premiere, picking up just 684,000 viewers", and questioned whether the show is compelling enough for viewers to continue watching.

Ratings

Season 1 (2016)

Season 2 (2017)

Awards and nominations

Home media

References

Australian drama television series
Network 10 original programming
2016 Australian television series debuts
2017 Australian television series endings
Television shows set in Melbourne
Television series by Playmaker Media